The .357 Smith & Wesson Magnum, .357 S&W Magnum, .357 Magnum, or 9×33mmR (as it is known in unofficial metric designation), is a smokeless powder cartridge with a  bullet diameter. It was created by Elmer Keith, Phillip B. Sharpe, and Douglas B. Wesson of firearm manufacturers Smith & Wesson and Winchester. The .357 Magnum cartridge is notable for its highly effective terminal ballistics.

The .357 Magnum cartridge is based upon Smith & Wesson's earlier .38 Special cartridge. It was introduced in 1935, and its use has since become widespread.

Design

The .357 Magnum was collaboratively developed over a period in the early to mid-1930s by a group of individuals in a direct response to Colt's .38 Super Automatic. At the time, the .38 Super was the only American pistol cartridge capable of defeating automobile cover and the early ballistic vests that were just beginning to emerge in the Interwar period. Colt's .38 Super Automatic just edged over that velocity and was able to penetrate car doors and vests that bootleggers and gangsters were employing as cover.

The .38 Special nomenclature relates to the previous use of heeled bullets (such as the .38 Short Colt and .38 Long Colt), which were the same diameter as the case. The only external dimensional difference between .38 Special and .357 magnum is the difference in case length; this was done to prevent accidentally loading a .357 magnum cartridge in to a .38 Special revolver that is not designed for the .357 magnum's higher chamber pressure. Case volume was not a factor in the increase in case length as the .38 Special cartridge was originally a black powder cartridge, and the .357 magnum was developed using only much denser smokeless powder.

Much credit for the .357's early development is given to hunter and experimenter Elmer Keith. Keith's early work in loading the .38 Special to increasingly higher-pressure levels was made possible by the availability of heavy, target-shooting-oriented revolvers like the Smith & Wesson .38-44 "Heavy Duty" and "Outdoorsman", .38-caliber revolvers built on .44-caliber frames. The .38-44 HV load used the .38-Special cartridge loaded to a much higher velocity than standard .38-Special ammunition. The .38-44 revolvers were made by using a .44 Special size gun with the barrel bored to accept .357-caliber bullets (the true bullet diameter of the .38 Special) and the cylinder bored to accept  cartridges (where the name “38 Special” originated). Since the frame, cylinder, and barrel were much stronger than the standard .38 Special components, it was capable of withstanding much higher pressures. The .38-44 HV round, while no longer available, was in most cases the equal of the later .357 Magnum, which works at more than double the pressure of standard .38 Special. Elmer Keith also contributed the Keith-style bullet, which increased the mass of bullet located outside the cartridge case, while leaving more room inside the case for powder. The Keith bullet also employed a large, flat meplat, thus enabling rapid energy transfer for greater wounding properties. At the same time, this bullet design does not deform like a hollow point, and as a result achieves greater penetration. These characteristics of the Keith bullet make it very suitable for hunting applications as well as for target shooting.

To reassert itself as the leading law-enforcement armament provider, Smith & Wesson developed the .357 Magnum, with Douglas B. Wesson (grandson of co-founder Daniel B. Wesson) leading the effort within Smith & Wesson, along with considerable technical assistance from Phillip B. Sharpe, a member of the technical division staff of the National Rifle Association of America. The new round was developed from Smith & Wesson's existing .38 Special round. The case extension was more a matter of safety than of necessity. Because the .38 Special and the early experimental .357 Magnum cartridges loaded by Keith were identical in physical attributes, it was possible to load an experimental .357 Magnum cartridge into a .38 Special revolver, with potentially disastrous results. Smith & Wesson's solution, of extending the case slightly, made it impossible to chamber the magnum-power round in a gun not designed for the additional pressure. However, although both .38 Special and .357 Magnum will chamber in Colt New Army revolvers in .38 Long Colt, due to the straight-walled chambers, this creates dangerous pressure levels, up to three times what the New Army is designed to withstand.

The choice of bullet for the .357 Magnum cartridge varied during its development. During the development at Smith & Wesson, the original Keith bullet was modified slightly, to the form of the Sharpe bullet, which itself was based upon the Keith bullet, but which had 5/6 of the bearing surface of the Keith bullet, Keith bullets typically being made oversized and sized down. Winchester, however, upon experimenting further during the cartridge development, modified the Sharpe-bullet shape slightly, while keeping the Sharpe contour of the bullet. The final choice of bullet was hence based upon the earlier Keith and Sharpe bullets, while additionally having slight differences from both.

Dimensions 

The .357 Magnum has 1.66 milliliter (26.2 grain ) cartridge case capacity.

The cartridge headspaces on the rim of the case. The common rifling twist rate for this cartridge is 476 mm (1 in 18.74 in), six grooves, ø lands = 8.79 mm, ø grooves = 9.02 mm, land width = 2.69 mm and the primer type is small pistol magnum.

According to the C.I.P. rulings, the .357 Magnum cartridge case can handle up to  Pmax piezo pressure. In C.I.P.-regulated countries every pistol cartridge combination has to be proofed at 130% of this maximum C.I.P. pressure to certify for sale to consumers. This means that .357 Magnum chambered arms in C.I.P.-regulated countries are currently proof tested at  PE piezo pressure.

Performance 

This cartridge is regarded by many as an excellent hunting, metallic silhouette, and self-defense round. With proper loadings it can also be effective against large or dangerous game, such as bear and ungulates; however, many consider the larger and more powerful magnum cartridges to be more appropriate, such as the .41 Magnum, .44 Magnum .454 Casull, .460 S&W Magnum, .480 Ruger, and .500 S&W Magnum. Comparatively, the .357 Magnum has less energy than the larger magnum revolver loadings but is smaller in diameter with high velocity allowing for excellent penetration properties. It is a fine small- and medium-game round and is sufficient to hunt deer at reasonable ranges if suitable loadings are used by a competent marksman. The .357 Magnum's effectiveness on game is similar to that of the .45 Colt, but with a much flatter trajectory due to its higher velocity. It has been used with success for self-defence, plinking, hunting, or target shooting.

The original 357 load was a 158 grain bullet with an advertised muzzle velocity of 1525 fps. (Muzzle velocity was taken using a revolver with a fairly long barrel of 8.75”) Most of today's loads are fairly mild when compared to the original load.

Revolvers chambered in .357 Magnum have the significant advantage of also being able to chamber and fire the shorter and less-powerful .38 Special cartridge. Compared to the .357 Magnum, .38 Special is also lower in cost, recoil, noise, and muzzle flash. The ability to also fire the .38 Special makes .357 revolvers ideal for novice shooters who are not yet used to firing full-power .357 magnum loads but do not want the expense of buying a second lower-powered gun to train with. However, .38 Special ammunition should not generally be used with any .357 magnum semiautomatic handgun or rifle, since such firearms require the larger recoil produced by firing a .357 Magnum round to cycle properly.

It has also become popular as a "dual-use" cartridge in short, light rifles like the American Old West lever-actions. In the 1930s it was found to be very effective against steel car doors and ballistic vests, and metal-penetrating rounds were once popular in the United States among highway patrol and other police organizations. The .357 magnum revolver has been largely replaced by modern, high-capacity semi-automatic pistols for police use, but it is still very popular for backup gun use and among outdoorsmen, security guards, and civilians for hunting, metallic silhouette, target shooting, and self-defense. The 9mm Winchester Magnum, which is also known as the 9×29mm, was developed to duplicate the performance of the .357 Magnum in a semi-automatic pistol, as was the .357 SIG cartridge.

Some common performance parameters are shown in the table below for several .357 Magnum loads. The  jacketed hollow point loads are popular for self-defence, whereas the heavier loads are commonly used for hunting. Loads are available with energies typically from 400 and 800 foot-pounds force (542 and 1,085 joules) and can be selected for various applications based on desired use and risk assessments.

Key:Expansion – expanded bullet diameter (ballistic gelatin) Penetration – penetration depth (ballistic gelatin)PC – permanent cavity volume (ballistic gelatin, FBI method) TSC'' – temporary stretch cavity volume (ballistic gelatin)

Comparison

In terms of accuracy, the .357 Magnum has at least the same potential for precision shooting as the benchmark .38 Special wadcutter round—indeed, a good .357 Magnum revolver will shoot .38 Special wadcutter ammunition with good results. It is this accuracy and power, and the versatility of also being capable of using less-expensive, milder .38 Special ammunition, that makes a .357 Magnum revolver an excellent gun for many different disciplines, from  precision shooting to long-range falling-plate events. It is an excellent round for those considering handloading ammunition, as it is economical and consistently performs well.

The .357 Magnum was developed from the earlier .38 Special. This was possible because the .38 Special was introduced in 1898 and originally designed to use black powder, which requires two-to-five times as much powder by volume to produce the same velocity with the same bullet as does the much more efficient smokeless powder. Thus, the .38 Special has a relatively large case capacity, and for lower pressures ( Pmax piezo pressure). The 9×19mm Parabellum was introduced in 1902 and was originally designed to use smokeless powder, and for higher pressures ( Pmax piezo pressure). It therefore produces considerably more energy than the .38, despite its case having less than half the powder capacity. Many .38 Special loads use the same powders, in similar charge weights, but because the case is so much larger, light-target loads with fast-burning powders may only fill the case perhaps 1/8 full. Filling the case with slower-burning powders produces much more power, but also much more pressure; far too much pressure for older, smaller-frame revolvers chambered in .38 Special. It was to accommodate these high-pressure, high-power loads that the longer .357 Magnum, together with the stronger revolvers designed to handle it, were developed.

The .357 SIG was developed in 1994 was named "357" to highlight its intended purpose: to duplicate the performance of  .357 Magnum loads fired from  revolvers, in a cartridge designed to be used in a semi-automatic pistol.

See also
 .357 Remington Maximum
 .357 SuperMag
 Coonan Arms
 Table of handgun and rifle cartridges

References
Notes

External links

".357 Magnum Stopping Power" Handloads.com
".357 Magnum is a ‘do it all’ cartridge for hunting and self-defense" by Boyko Nikolov at BulgarianMilitary.com

Weapons and ammunition introduced in 1934
Magnum pistol cartridges
Pistol and rifle cartridges
 
Rimmed cartridges
Smith & Wesson cartridges
Winchester Repeating Arms Company cartridges